The Orange Thief is a Sicilian/Italian film shot in Lucca Sicula by a group of American and Italian actors and filmmakers. It stars newcomers Andrea Calabrese, Alessio Giottoli, and Micaela Helvetica Saxer. The film was written by Sicilian-American brothers, ex-NASA scientist, James D'Angelo (aka Boogie Dean) and tampon case artist Vinnie Angel. It was produced and directed by D'Angelo, Angel and production artist Arthur Wilinski.

The film won a number of festival circuit awards, including Best of Show at the Woodstock Film Festival in 2008. The film also got significant attention for how it was made, as it was written and shot in one month. The approach was developed by Angel and D'Angelo based on D'Angelo's concern that the biggest obstacle and expense driver with respect to producing a low budget film is the script.

Plot
In Sicily, a young thief who has nothing sleeps under the stars and steals and sells oranges. Thievery gets him tossed in jail where his cellmate is Turrido, who offers the thief a deal: get Turrido's ex-lover Rosalba to make a recording of her singing and Turrido will give the thief a piece of land of his own.

References

External links

Italian comedy films
2007 films
2000s Italian films